Sosoye is a village of Wallonia and a district of the municipality of Anhée, located in the province of Namur, Belgium. 

Sosoye lies in the valley of the Molignée and had 151 inhabitants in 2007.

Sub-municipalities of Anhée
Former municipalities of Namur (province)